Wallmapu is a name for the traditional territory and historical country of the Mapuche people of southern South America. The term was coined in the early 1990s by Indigenist groups but gained traction in the 2000s as the Mapuche conflict in Araucanía intensified. Some view the Wallmapu as being composed of two main parts Ngulumapu in the west and Puelmapu in the east, with the southern part of Ngulumapu being known as Futahuillimapu.

On May 19, 2022 a conference on the topic "The threat of Wallmapu" was held in the city of Neuquén, Argentina.

See also
Araucanization
Incas in Central Chile

References

Geography of Argentina
Geography of Chile
Mapuche regions
Historical regions
Huilliche
1990s neologisms